Chitkara University, Himachal Pradesh  is a private university located at the HIMUDA Education Hub, near the village Kallujhanda, Solan district, Himachal Pradesh, India. The university was established in 2009 by the  Chitkara Educational Trust through the Chitkara University (Establishment and Regulation) Act, 2008.  Chitkara Educational Trust, founded by Ashok K. Chitkara and Madhu Chitkara, who serve as the institute's Chancellor and Pro-chancellor respectively, has also set up Chitkara University, Punjab.

Schools
The university includes six schools:
 Chitkara School of Engineering & Technology
 Chitkara School of Hospitality Management
 Chitkara School of Basic Sciences
 Chitkara School of Computer Applications
 Chitkara School of Pharmacy
 Chitkara School of Nursing

Academics
Chitkara University offers 4-Year Bachelor of Engineering (B.E.) programmes in various engineering and technology fields. Candidates with a 3-year diploma in Engineering or an equivalent degree
can also join a 3-year lateral entry B.E. programmes. Master of Engineering (ME) programmes are also available. The university also offers doctoral programmes.

Approval
Like all universities in India, Chitkara University, Himachal Pradesh is recognised by the University Grants Commission (UGC), which has also sent an expert committee. The UGC states that "University to take corrective measures in respect of the suggestions of the UGC inspection committee and approach UGC after two years". The university is accredited by the National Assessment and Accreditation Council (NAAC) with a score of 2.71 out of 4 and a "B" grade. The university is also a member of the Association of Indian Universities (AIU).

References

External links

Education in Solan district
Universities in Himachal Pradesh
Educational institutions established in 2009
2009 establishments in Himachal Pradesh
Private universities in India